Saaed Khalifa is an Iraqi actor and comedian. He stars in a television series called Hurry Up, He's Dead written by Baghdadi poet and writer, Talib Al Sudani which is filmed in Dubai; as it would be too dangerous and impractical, with curfews and loud helicopters flying overhead, to film in Baghdad.

External links
Article on Saaed Khalifa at Seattle Times
Article on Hurry Up, He's Dead
Iraq's version of "The Daily Show" Strikes a Chord
Article on Show

Year of birth missing (living people)
Living people
Iraqi male television actors
Iraqi comedians